Lhotse Shar is a subsidiary mountain of Lhotse, at  high. It was first climbed by Sepp Mayerl and Rolf Walter on 12 May 1970.

Climbing routes and dangers

Lhotse Shar is located far from the main summit's standard route of ascent via the South Col. As Lhotse's central summits are themselves extremely difficult climbs and make a traverse to the Shar along the main ridge impractical, most climbers instead opt for the most direct route of ascent, up Lhotse's south face. This exceptionally steep and hazardous route has been the site of many fatalities; indeed, of Lhotse's documented deaths as of 2021, a third (11 of 31) have occurred on Lhotse Shar. It has the highest fatality rate of all principal or secondary eight-thousander summits – for every two people who summit the mountain, one person dies attempting to. The mountain's extreme height further compounds the danger: At 8,383 meters above sea level, it is 292 meters (958 feet) higher than Annapurna I Main, the next-deadliest summit of the eight-thousanders, and well into the Death zone, greatly increasing the risk of altitude sickness for climbers.

Incidents

 On 27 April 1980, Nicolas Jaeger was seen for the last time at  altitude on Lhotse Shar, and is presumed dead. Jaeger was attempting a traverse from the Shar to Lhotse Main.

 27 September 1987 saw the single deadliest day on Lhotse Shar, as four Spanish climbers fell 1,500 meters to their deaths in an avalanche. The partial recovery of the team's remains by British climbers Alan and Adrian Burgess is recounted in Jon Krakauer's 1990 compendium Eiger Dreams: Ventures Among Men and Mountains.

References

Eight-thousanders of the Himalayas
Mountains of Koshi Province
Mountains of Tibet